In Greek mythology, Sterope (Ancient Greek: Στερόπη, from , steropē, lightning) was a daughter of Cepheus, king of Tegea in Arcadia. She received from Heracles a lock of the Gorgon Medusa's hair to help her protect her hometown, Tegea from attack thus the hero won Cepheus' friendship.

Note

References 
 Pseudo-Apollodorus, The Library with an English Translation by Sir James George Frazer, F.B.A., F.R.S. in 2 Volumes, Cambridge, MA, Harvard University Press; London, William Heinemann Ltd. 1921. Online version at the Perseus Digital Library. Greek text available from the same website.

Princesses in Greek mythology
Mythology of Heracles
Arcadian mythology